Lake Cyohoha South or Cyohoha Sud as it is known in Rwanda or Lake Cohoha in Burundi is a small lake in East Africa. It straddles the border between Burundi and Rwanda. In Rwanda, it is known as Cyohoha South to differentiate it from the nearby much smaller Cyohoha North 10 miles North into Rwanda. In Burundi, it is simply known as Cohoha. It is a narrow yet very long lake with many branches. It is largely bisected by the border between Rwanda and Burundi, however, its southern portion extends entirely into Burundi.

Lake Cyohoha South just as its cousin Cyohoha North empties into the Akanyaru River via a series of marshlands that connect these lakes to the river.

Lake Cyohoha is 10 miles West of the larger Lake Rweru, the second lake on the Rwanda - Burundi border.

References

Cohoha
Cyohoha South
Burundi–Rwanda border
Cyohoha